Gabriel Curtis Dean (born June 19, 1994) is an American retired freestyle and Greco-Roman wrestler and graduated folkstyle wrestler who formerly competed at 86 kilograms. In freestyle, he was the 2020 US National Champion, a '17 Pan American Championship medalist, and a '14 Junior World Championship medalist. He was also the '15 Pan American Championship runner–up in Greco-Roman. As a collegiate wrestler, Dean was a two–time NCAA Division I champion, a four–time EIWA Conference champion, and a four–time NCAA Division I All-American for the Cornell Big Red.

Folkstyle career

High school 
Dean was born in Lowell, Michigan, where he went on to attend Lowell High School. His father David was an NCAA Division I National runner-up out of the University of Minnesota, which led to Gabriel's early start in the sport of wrestling. During his high school years, Dean was a standout wrestler and football player, and as a quarterback, he led his team to a state title and runner–up finishes and was a two–time All-State player. In wrestling, he went on to make the finals of the MHSAA state tournament, winning the title in an undefeated run as a junior and ending his senior year as the runner–up.

College 
Dean chose to attend the Cornell University and wrestle there. During his four years of collegiate wrestling, Dean went on to become one of the most decorated athletes in the history of the team, claiming two NCAA titles and four EIWA conference titles, as well as racking up four All-American honors and a runner–up finish as a senior, where he lost to eventual three–timer Bo Nickal from Penn State in a legendarily close match. In regards to honors, Dean was a two–time EIWA and Ivy League Wrestler of the Year, as well as the Rookie of the Year as a freshman.

International career

2013–2017 
Dean, who was graduating high school, made his senior freestyle debut on May 2013, when he went on to place third at the Northeastern Regionals and sixth at the US University Nationals. At the 2015 Pan American Championships, Dean made his Greco-Roman debut with no previous training in the discipline, and went on to place second. In April 2017, Dean decided to wrestle at the US Open in freestyle, and went on to place sixth. Afterwards, he placed third at the Pan American Championships, with technical falls over former Olympian from Colombia Carlos Izquierdo and South American Games runner–up from Peru Pool Ambrocio. Dean then announced he would try his hand as a Greco–Roman wrestler, but after competing and losing in his first match at the 2017 US U23 World Team Trials, he decided to retire.

2020–2021 
In October 2020, Dean opted to come out of retirement to compete at the US Nationals, where he claimed the title after defeating former All-American Nate Jackson in the finals. Next, he competed at the Flo 8-Man Challenge: 195 lbs, where he lost in the first match to Taylor Lujan (whom he had tech'd weeks earlier) after dominating prior to a pin. Dean then confirmed he would take a run for the US Olympic Team Trials. In November, Dean wrestled World Champion David Taylor at the NLWC III and went to a fairly close decision loss.

To start off the 2021 year, he earned the biggest win of his career when he defeated U23 World Champion Bo Nickal at the NLWC III, while also earning revenge from the '17 NCAA's, before being tech'd by three–time World and Olympic champion at 97 kg Kyle Snyder. On March, he earned a spot at the US Olympic Team Trials when he won the US Last Chance Olympic Trials Qualifier as the top–seed, defeating Nate Jackson and NCAA champion Drew Foster in the process. At the US Olympic Team Trials, Dean defeated former NCAA champion Myles Martin before being downed himself by David Taylor in a rematch, failing to make the team. After his last run, Dean returned to retirement from competition.

Freestyle record 

! colspan="7"| Senior Freestyle Matches
|-
!  Res.
!  Record
!  Opponent
!  Score
!  Date
!  Event
!  Location
|-
! style=background:white colspan=7 |
|-
|Loss
|27–11
|align=left| David Taylor
|style="font-size:88%"|0–4
|style="font-size:88%" rowspan=2|April 2, 2021
|style="font-size:88%" rowspan=2|2020 US Olympic Team Trials
|style="text-align:left;font-size:88%;" rowspan=2| Forth Worth, Texas
|-
|Win
|27–10
|align=left| Myles Martin
|style="font-size:88%"|2–1
|-
! style=background:white colspan=7 |
|-
|Win
|26–10
|align=left| Nate Jackson
|style="font-size:88%"|7–2
|style="font-size:88%" rowspan=5|March 27, 2021
|style="font-size:88%" rowspan=5|2020 US Last Chance Olympic Team Trials Qualifier
|style="text-align:left;font-size:88%;" rowspan=5|
 Forth Worth, Texas
|-
|Win
|25–10
|align=left| Drew Foster
|style="font-size:88%"|8–0
|-
|Win
|24–10
|align=left| C.J. Brucki
|style="font-size:88%"|TF 12–2
|-
|Win
|23–10
|align=left| Jonathan Loew
|style="font-size:88%"|FF
|-
|Win
|22–10
|align=left| Jake Hendricks
|style="font-size:88%"|TF 10–0
|-
|Loss
|21–10
|align=left| Kyle Snyder
|style="font-size:88%"|TF 2–13
|style="font-size:88%" rowspan=2|February 23, 2021
|style="font-size:88%" rowspan=2|NLWC V
|style="text-align:left;font-size:88%;" rowspan=3|
 State College, Pennsylvania
|-
|Win
|21–9
|align=left| Bo Nickal
|style="font-size:88%"|3–2
|-
|Loss
|20–9
|align=left| David Taylor
|style="font-size:88%"|2–6
|style="font-size:88%"|November 24, 2020
|style="font-size:88%"|NLWC III
|-
! style=background:white colspan=7 |
|-
|Win
|20–8
|align=left| Nate Jackson
|style="font-size:88%"|1–1
|style="font-size:88%" rowspan=5|October 10–11, 2020
|style="font-size:88%" rowspan=5|2020 US Senior Nationals
|style="text-align:left;font-size:88%;" rowspan=5|
 Coralville, Iowa
|-
|Win
|19–8
|align=left| Trent Hidlay
|style="font-size:88%"|2–1
|-
|Win
|18–8
|align=left| Taylor Lujan
|style="font-size:88%"|TF 10–0
|-
|Win
|17–8
|align=left| Nathan Haas
|style="font-size:88%"|Fall
|-
|Win
|16–8
|align=left| Leonardo Tarantino
|style="font-size:88%"|TF 12–1
|-
! style=background:white colspan=7 |
|-
|Loss
|15–8
|align=left| Taylor Lujan
|style="font-size:88%"|Fall
|style="font-size:88%" |October 31, 2020
|style="font-size:88%" |FloWrestling 8-Man Challenge
|style="text-align:left;font-size:88%;" |
 Austin, Texas
|-
! style=background:white colspan=7 |
|-
|Win
|15–7
|align=left| Pool Ambrocio
|style="font-size:88%"|TF 12–2
|style="font-size:88%" rowspan=3|May 5–7, 2017
|style="font-size:88%" rowspan=3|2017 Pan American Wrestling Championships
|style="text-align:left;font-size:88%;" rowspan=3|
 Lauro de Freitas, Brazil
|-
|Loss
|14–7
|align=left| Yurieski Torreblanca
|style="font-size:88%"|4–6
|-
|Win
|14–6
|align=left| Carlos Izquierdo
|style="font-size:88%"|TF 11–0
|-
! style=background:white colspan=7 |
|-
|Win
|13–6
|align=left| TJ Dudley
|style="font-size:88%"|8–8
|style="font-size:88%" rowspan=6|April 26–29, 2017
|style="font-size:88%" rowspan=6|2017 US Open National Championships
|style="text-align:left;font-size:88%;" rowspan=6|
 Las Vegas, Nevada
|-
|Loss
|12–6
|align=left| Pat Downey
|style="font-size:88%"|6–7
|-
|Win
|12–5
|align=left| Austin Trotman
|style="font-size:88%"|13–10
|-
|Loss
|11–5
|align=left| Nick Heflin
|style="font-size:88%"|3–6
|-
|Win
|11–4
|align=left| Kyle Crutchmer
|style="font-size:88%"|TF 15–4
|-
|Win
|10–4
|align=left| John Rizqallah
|style="font-size:88%"|TF 10–0
|-
! style=background:white colspan=7 |
|-
|Loss
|9–4
|align=left| Alex Meyer
|style="font-size:88%"|5–6
|style="font-size:88%" rowspan=9|May 23–26, 2013
|style="font-size:88%" rowspan=9|2013 ASICS US University National Championships
|style="text-align:left;font-size:88%;" rowspan=9|
 Akron, Ohio
|-
|Loss
|9–3
|align=left| Max Thomusseit
|style="font-size:88%"|1–3
|-
|Win
|9–2
|align=left| Nathaniel Brown
|style="font-size:88%"|INJ
|-
|Win
|8–2
|align=left| Kyle Crutchmer
|style="font-size:88%"|TF 11–1
|-
|Win
|7–2
|align=left| James Mannier
|style="font-size:88%"|TF 10–0
|-
|Win
|6–2
|align=left| Kris Klapprodt
|style="font-size:88%"|14–8
|-
|Loss
|5–2
|align=left| Kenneth Courts
|style="font-size:88%"|Fall
|-
|Win
|5–1
|align=left| Derek Thomas
|style="font-size:88%"|TF 12–2
|-
|Win
|4–1
|align=left| Brian Engdahl
|style="font-size:88%"|TF 11–0
|-
! style=background:white colspan=7 |
|-
|Win
|3-1
|align=left| Scott Gibbons
|style="font-size:88%"|3–0, 5–2
|style="font-size:88%" rowspan=4|May 3–5, 2013
|style="font-size:88%" rowspan=4|2013 NE Regional Championships
|style="text-align:left;font-size:88%;" rowspan=4|
 East Stroudsburg, Pennsylvania
|-
|Win
|2–1
|align=left| Tyler Wood
|style="font-size:88%"|6–0, 5–0
|-
|Loss
|1–1
|align=left| Enock Francois
|style="font-size:88%"|0–2, 0–1
|-
|Win
|1–0
|align=left| Andrew Detwiler
|style="font-size:88%"|Fall
|-

Greco-Roman record 

! colspan="7"| Senior Greco-Roman Matches
|-
!  Res.
!  Record
!  Opponent
!  Score
!  Date
!  Event
!  Location
|-
! style=background:white colspan=7 |
|-
|Loss
|2–2
|align=left| Spencer Wilson
|style="font-size:88%"|TF 2–10
|style="font-size:88%" |October 7, 2017
|style="font-size:88%" |2017 US U23 World Team Trials
|style="text-align:left;font-size:88%;" |
 Rochester, Minnesota
|-
! style=background:white colspan=7 |
|-
|Loss
|2–1
|align=left| Gilberto Piquet Herrera
|style="font-size:88%"|0–4
|style="font-size:88%" rowspan=3|April 24–26, 2015
|style="font-size:88%" rowspan=3|2015 Pan American Championships
|style="text-align:left;font-size:88%;" rowspan=3|
 Santiago, Chile
|-
|Win
|2–0
|align=left| Luis Betancourt
|style="font-size:88%"|INJ
|-
|Win
|1–0
|align=left| Querys Pérez
|style="font-size:88%"|6–1
|-

NCAA record 

! colspan="8"| NCAA Championships Matches
|-
!  Res.
!  Record
!  Opponent
!  Score
!  Date
!  Event
|-
! style=background:white colspan=6 |2017 NCAA Championships  at 184 lbs
|-
|Loss
|19–2
|align=left| Bo Nickal
|style="font-size:88%"|3–4
|style="font-size:88%" rowspan=5|March 16–18, 2017
|style="font-size:88%" rowspan=5|2017 NCAA Division I Wrestling Championships
|-
|Win
|19–1
|align=left|Nolan Boyd
|style="font-size:88%"|9–3
|-
|Win
|18–1
|align=left|Jack Dechow
|style="font-size:88%"|TB–1 4–3
|-
|Win
|17–1
|align=left|Jordan Ellingwood
|style="font-size:88%"|MD 11–3
|-
|Win
|16–1
|align=left| Michael Coleman
|style="font-size:88%"|MD 21–12
|-
! style=background:white colspan=6 |2016 NCAA Championships  at 184 lbs
|-
|Win
|15–1
|align=left| Timothy Dudley
|style="font-size:88%"|5–3
|style="font-size:88%" rowspan=5|March 17–19, 2016
|style="font-size:88%" rowspan=5|2016 NCAA Division I Wrestling Championships
|-
|Win
|14–1
|align=left|Pete Renda
|style="font-size:88%"|9–4
|-
|Win
|13–1
|align=left|Nolan Boyd
|style="font-size:88%"|10–4
|-
|Win
|12–1
|align=left|Thomas Sleigh
|style="font-size:88%"|Fall
|-
|Win
|11–1
|align=left| Jack Dechow
|style="font-size:88%"|3–1
|-
! style=background:white colspan=6 |2015 NCAA Championships  at 184 lbs
|-
|Win
|10–1
|align=left| Nathaniel Brown
|style="font-size:88%"|6–2
|style="font-size:88%" rowspan=5|March 19–21, 2015
|style="font-size:88%" rowspan=5|2015 NCAA Division I Wrestling Championships
|-
|Win
|9–1
|align=left|Victor Avery
|style="font-size:88%"|TB–2 4–3
|-
|Win
|8–1
|align=left|Sammy Brooks
|style="font-size:88%"|3–2
|-
|Win
|7–1
|align=left|Timothy Dudley
|style="font-size:88%"|9–8
|-
|Win
|6–1
|align=left| Patrick Kissell
|style="font-size:88%"|MD 10–1
|-
! style=background:white colspan=6 |2014 NCAA Championships  at 184 lbs
|-
|Win
|5–1
|align=left|Jack Dechow
|style="font-size:88%"|5–4
|style="font-size:88%" rowspan=6|March 20–22, 2014
|style="font-size:88%" rowspan=6|2014 NCAA Division I Wrestling Championships
|-
|Win
|4–1
|align=left|Lawrence Thomas
|style="font-size:88%"|Fall
|-
|Loss
|3–1
|align=left|Ed Ruth
|style="font-size:88%"|3–5
|-
|Win
|3–0
|align=left|Jacob Swartz
|style="font-size:88%"|11–4
|-
|Win
|2–0
|align=left|John Rizqallah
|style="font-size:88%"|11–4
|-
|Win
|1–0
|align=left| Lelund Weatherspoon
|style="font-size:88%"|MD 12–4
|-

References 

American male sport wrestlers
1994 births
Living people
Cornell Big Red wrestlers
Cornell University alumni
Sportspeople from Michigan
Amateur wrestlers